During the 1992–93 English football season, Sunderland A.F.C. competed in the Football League First Division.

Season summary
In the 1992–93 season and despite guiding the Black Cats to an FA Cup final the previous season, Crosby failed to inspire Sunderland in the league, and he was sacked in February 1993 to be replaced by Terry Butcher.

Butcher managed to achieve survival for Sunderland finishing one point above the relegation zone, despite winning only 5 of their final 18 league games.

Final league table

Results
Sunderland's score comes first

Legend

Football League First Division

FA Cup

League Cup

Anglo-Italian Cup

Squad

References

Notes

Sunderland A.F.C. seasons
Sunderland